This is a list of casinos in Florida.

List of casinos

Gallery

See also

List of casinos in the United States 
List of casino hotels

References

External links

Pari-Mutuel Wagering Facilities with Operating Licenses
INDIAN Casinos & PMW Slots MAP

 
Casinos 
Florida